

Events

Pre-1600
453 BC – Spring and Autumn period: The house of Zhao defeats the house of Zhi, ending the Battle of Jinyang, a military conflict between the elite families of the State of Jin.
 413 – Emperor Honorius signs an edict providing tax relief for the Italian provinces Tuscia, Campania, Picenum, Samnium, Apulia, Lucania and Calabria, which were plundered by the Visigoths.
 589 – Reccared I opens the Third Council of Toledo, marking the entry of Visigothic Spain into the Catholic Church.
1360 – Treaty of Brétigny drafted between King Edward III of England and King John II of France (the Good).
1373 – Julian of Norwich, a Christian mystic and anchoress, experiences the deathbed visions described in her Revelations of Divine Love.
1429 – Joan of Arc lifts the Siege of Orléans, turning the tide of the Hundred Years' War.
1450 – Kentishmen revolt against King Henry VI.
1516 – A group of imperial guards, led by Trịnh Duy Sản, murdered Emperor Lê Tương Dực and fled, leaving the capital Thăng Long undefended.
1541 – Hernando de Soto stops near present-day Walls, Mississippi, and sees the Mississippi River (then known by the Spanish as Río de Espíritu Santo, the name given to it by Alonso Álvarez de Pineda in 1519).

1601–1900
1608 – A newly nationalized silver mine in Scotland at Hilderston, West Lothian is re-opened by Bevis Bulmer.
1639 – William Coddington founds Newport, Rhode Island.
1758 – The Maratha Empire captures Peshawar from the Durrani Empire in the Battle of Peshawar.
1788 – King Louis XVI of France attempts to impose the reforms of Étienne Charles de Loménie de Brienne by abolishing the parlements.
1794 – Branded a traitor during the Reign of Terror, French chemist Antoine Lavoisier, who was also a tax collector with the Ferme générale, is tried, convicted and guillotined in one day in Paris.
1821 – Greek War of Independence: The Greeks defeat the Turks at the Battle of Gravia Inn.
1842 – A train derails and catches fire in Paris, killing between 52 and 200 people.
1846 – Mexican–American War: American forces led by Zachary Taylor defeat a Mexican force north of the Rio Grande in the first major battle of the war.
1877 – At Gilmore's Gardens in New York City, the first Westminster Kennel Club Dog Show opens.
1886 – Pharmacist John Pemberton first sells a carbonated beverage named "Coca-Cola" as a patent medicine.
1898 – The first games of the Italian football league system are played.
1899 – The Irish Literary Theatre in Dublin produced its first play.

1901–present
1902 – In Martinique, Mount Pelée erupts, destroying the town of Saint-Pierre and killing over 30,000 people. Only a handful of residents survive the blast.
1912 – Paramount Pictures is founded.
1919 – Edward George Honey proposes the idea of a moment of silence to commemorate the Armistice of 11 November 1918 which ended World War I.
1921 – The creation of the Communist Party of Romania.
1924 – The Klaipėda Convention is signed formally incorporating Klaipėda Region (Memel Territory) into Lithuania.
1927 – Attempting to make the first non-stop transatlantic flight from Paris to New York, French war heroes Charles Nungesser and François Coli disappear after taking off aboard The White Bird biplane.
1933 – Mohandas Gandhi begins a 21-day fast of self-purification and launched a one-year campaign to help the Harijan movement.
1941 – World War II: The German Luftwaffe launches a bombing raid on Nottingham and Derby.
1942 – World War II: The German 11th Army begins Operation Trappenjagd (Bustard Hunt) and destroys the bridgehead of the three Soviet armies defending the Kerch Peninsula.
  1942   – World War II: The Battle of the Coral Sea comes to an end with Imperial Japanese Navy aircraft carrier aircraft attacking and sinking the United States Navy aircraft carrier .
  1942   – World War II: Gunners of the Ceylon Garrison Artillery on Horsburgh Island in the Cocos Islands rebel in the Cocos Islands Mutiny. Their mutiny is crushed and three of them are executed, the only British Commonwealth soldiers to be executed for mutiny during the Second World War.
1945 – World War II: The German Instrument of Surrender signed at Berlin-Karlshorst comes into effect. 
  1945   – End of the Prague uprising, celebrated now as a national holiday in the Czech Republic.
  1945   – Hundreds of Algerian civilians are killed by French Army soldiers in the Sétif massacre.
  1945   – The Halifax riot starts when thousands of civilians and servicemen rampage through Halifax, Nova Scotia.
1946 – Estonian schoolgirls Aili Jõgi and Ageeda Paavel blow up the Soviet memorial which preceded the Bronze Soldier of Tallinn.
1950 – The Tollund Man was discovered in a peat bog near Silkeborg, Denmark.
1957 – South Vietnamese President Ngo Dinh Diem began a state visit to the United States, his regime's main sponsor.
1963 – South Vietnamese soldiers under the Roman Catholic President Ngo Dinh Diem open fire on Buddhists defying a ban on the flying of the Buddhist flag on Vesak, killing nine and sparking the Buddhist crisis.
1967 – The Philippine province of Davao is split into three: Davao del Norte, Davao del Sur, and Davao Oriental.
1970 – The Beatles release their 12th and final studio album Let It Be.
1972 – Vietnam War: U.S. President Richard Nixon announces his order to place naval mines in major North Vietnamese ports in order to stem the flow of weapons and other goods to that nation.
1973 – A 71-day standoff between federal authorities and the American Indian Movement members occupying the Pine Ridge Reservation at Wounded Knee, South Dakota ends with the surrender of the militants.
1976 – The rollercoaster The New Revolution, the first steel coaster with a vertical loop, opens at Six Flags Magic Mountain.
1978 – The first ascent of Mount Everest without supplemental oxygen, by Reinhold Messner and Peter Habeler.
1980 – The World Health Organization confirms the eradication of smallpox.
1984 – Corporal Denis Lortie enters the Quebec National Assembly and opens fire, killing three people and wounding 13. René Jalbert, Sergeant-at-Arms of the Assembly, succeeds in calming him, for which he will later receive the Cross of Valour.
  1984   – The USSR announces a boycott upon the Summer Olympics at Los Angeles, later joined by 14 other countries.
  1984   – The Thames Barrier is officially opened, preventing the floodplain of most of Greater London from being flooded except under extreme circumstances.
1987 – The SAS kills eight Provisional Irish Republican Army volunteers and a civilian during an ambush in Loughgall, Northern Ireland.
1988 – A fire at Illinois Bell's Hinsdale Central Office triggers an extended 1AESS network outage once considered to be the "worst telecommunications disaster in US telephone industry history".
1997 – China Southern Airlines Flight 3456 crashes on approach into Bao'an International Airport, killing 35 people.
2019 – British 17-year-old Isabelle Holdaway is reported to be the first patient ever to receive a genetically modified phage therapy to treat a drug-resistant infection.
2021 – A car bomb explodes in front of a school in Kabul, capital city of Afghanistan killing at least 55 people and wounding over 150.

Births

Pre-1600
1326 – Joan I, Countess of Auvergne (d. 1360)
1427 – John Tiptoft, 1st Earl of Worcester, Lord High Treasurer (d. 1470)
1460 – Frederick I, Margrave of Brandenburg-Ansbach (d. 1536)
1492 – Andrea Alciato, Italian jurist and writer (d. 1550)
1508 – Charles Wriothesley, English Officer of Arms (d. 1562)
1521 – Peter Canisius, Dutch-Swiss priest and saint (d. 1597)
1551 – Thomas Drury, English government informer and swindler (d. 1603)
1587 – Victor Amadeus I, Duke of Savoy (d. 1637)

1601–1900
1622 – Claes Rålamb, Swedish politician (d. 1698)
1628 – Angelo Italia, Sicilian Jesuit and architect (d. 1700)
1629 – Niels Juel, Norwegian-Danish admiral (d. 1697)
1632 – Heino Heinrich Graf von Flemming, German field marshal and politician (d. 1706)
1639 – Giovanni Battista Gaulli, Italian artist (d. 1709)
1641 – Nicolaes Witsen, Mayor of Amsterdam, Netherlands (d. 1717)
1653 – Claude Louis Hector de Villars, French general and politician, French Minister of Defence (d. 1734)
1670 – Charles Beauclerk, 1st Duke of St Albans, English soldier and politician, Lord Lieutenant of Berkshire (d. 1726)
1698 – Henry Baker, English naturalist (d. 1774)
1720 – William Cavendish, 4th Duke of Devonshire, English politician, Prime Minister of the United Kingdom (d. 1764)
1735 – Nathaniel Dance-Holland, English painter and politician (d. 1811)
1737 – Edward Gibbon, English historian and politician (d. 1794)
1745 – Carl Stamitz, German violinist and composer (d. 1801)
1753 – Miguel Hidalgo y Costilla, Mexican priest and rebel leader (d. 1811)
1786 – John Vianney, French priest and saint (d. 1859)
1815 – Edward Tompkins, American lawyer and politician (d. 1872)
1818 – Samuel Leonard Tilley, Canadian pharmacist and politician, 3rd Premier of New Brunswick (d. 1896)
1821 – William Henry Vanderbilt, American businessman and philanthropist (d. 1885)
1824 – William Walker, American physician, lawyer, journalist and mercenary (d. 1860)
1825 – George Bruce Malleson, English-Indian colonel and author (d. 1898)
1828 – Henry Dunant, Swiss businessman and activist, co-founded the Red Cross, Nobel Prize laureate (d. 1910)
  1828   – Charbel Makhluf, Lebanese monk and saint (d. 1898)
1829 – Louis Moreau Gottschalk, American pianist and composer (d. 1869)
1835 – Bertalan Székely, Hungarian painter and academic (d. 1910)
1839 – Adolphe-Basile Routhier, Canadian judge, author, and songwriter (d. 1920)
1842 – Emil Christian Hansen, Danish physiologist and mycologist (d. 1909)
1846 – Oscar Hammerstein I, American businessman and composer (d. 1919)
1850 – Ross Barnes, American baseball player and manager (d. 1915)
1853 – Dan Brouthers, American baseball player and manager (d. 1932)
1856 – Pedro Lascuráin, Mexican politician, president for 45 minutes on February 13, 1913. (d. 1952)
1858 – Heinrich Berté, Slovak-Austrian composer (d. 1924)
  1858   – J. Meade Falkner, English author and poet (d. 1932)
1859 – Johan Jensen, Danish mathematician and engineer (d. 1925)
1867 – Margarete Böhme, German novelist (d. 1939)
1879 – Wesley Coe, American shot putter, discus thrower, and tug of war competitor (d. 1926)
1884 – Harry S. Truman, American colonel and politician, 33rd President of the United States (d. 1972)
1885 – Thomas B. Costain, Canadian journalist and author (d. 1965)
1892 – Adriaan Pelt, Dutch journalist and diplomat (d. 1981)
1893 – Francis Ouimet, American golfer (d. 1967)
  1893   – Edd Roush, American baseball player and coach (d. 1988)
  1893   – Teddy Wakelam, English rugby player and sportscaster (d. 1963)
1895 – James H. Kindelberger, American businessman (d. 1962)
  1895   – Fulton J. Sheen, American archbishop (d. 1979)
  1895   – Edmund Wilson, American critic, essayist, and editor (d. 1972)
1898 – Aloysius Stepinac, Croatian cardinal (d. 1960)
1899 – Arthur Q. Bryan, American actor, voice actor, comedian and radio personality (d. 1959)
  1899   – Friedrich Hayek, Austrian economist and philosopher, Nobel Prize laureate (d. 1992)
  1899   – Jacques Heim, French fashion designer (d. 1967)

1901–present
1901 – Turkey Stearnes, American baseball player (d. 1979)
1902 – André Michel Lwoff, French microbiologist and physician, Nobel Prize laureate (d. 1994)
1903 – Fernandel, French actor and singer (d. 1971)
  1903   – Mary Stewart, Baroness Stewart of Alvechurch, British politician and educator (d. 1984)
1904 – John Snagge, English journalist (d. 1996)
1905 – Red Nichols, American cornet player, composer, and bandleader (d. 1965)
1906 – Roberto Rossellini, Italian director and screenwriter (d. 1977)
1910 – George Male, English footballer (d. 1998)
  1910   – Andrew E. Svenson, American author and publisher (d. 1975)
  1910   – Mary Lou Williams, American pianist and composer (d. 1981)
1911 – Wilhelm Friedrich de Gaay Fortman, Dutch jurist and politician, Dutch Minister of The Interior (d. 1997)
  1911   – Robert Johnson, American singer-songwriter and guitarist (d. 1938)
1912 – George Woodcock, Canadian author and poet (d. 1995)
1913 – Bob Clampett, American animator, director, and producer (d. 1984)
  1913   – Sid James, South African-English actor and singer (d. 1976)
1915 – John Archer, American actor (d. 1999)
  1915   – Milton Meltzer, American historian and author (d. 2009)
1916 – João Havelange, Brazilian water polo player, lawyer, and businessman (d. 2016)
  1916   – Chinmayananda Saraswati, Indian spiritual leader and educator (d. 1993)
  1916   – Ramananda Sengupta, Indian cinematographer (d. 2017)
1917 – John Anderson, Jr., American lawyer and politician, 36th Governor of Kansas (d. 2014)
1919 – Lex Barker, American actor (d. 1973)
1920 – Saul Bass, American graphic designer and director (d. 1996)
  1920   – Barbara Howard, Canadian sprinter and educator (d. 2017)
  1920   – Tom of Finland, Finnish illustrator (d. 1991)
  1920   – Sloan Wilson, American author and poet (d. 2003)
  1920   – Gordon McClymont, Australian ecologist and academic (d. 2000)
1922 – Mary Q. Steele, American naturalist and author (d. 1992)
1924 – S. Vithiananthan, Sri Lankan author and academic (d. 1989)
1925 – Ali Hassan Mwinyi, Tanzanian politician, 2nd President of Tanzania
1926 – David Attenborough, English environmentalist and television host
  1926   – David Hurst, German actor (d. 2019)
  1926   – Don Rickles, American comedian and actor (d. 2017)
1927 – Chumy Chúmez, Spanish actor, director, and screenwriter (d. 2003)
  1927   – László Paskai, Hungarian cardinal (d. 2015)
1928 – Robert Conley, American journalist (d. 2013)
  1928   – Ted Sorensen, American lawyer, 8th White House Counsel (d. 2010)
1929 – Ethel D. Allen, American physician and politician (d. 1981)
  1929   – John C. Bogle, American businessman, investor, and philanthropist (d. 2019)
  1929   – Girija Devi, Indian classical singer (d. 2017)
  1929   – Claude Castonguay, Canadian banker and politician (d. 2020)
  1929   – Miyoshi Umeki, Japanese-American actress and singer (d. 2007)
1930 – Heather Harper, Northern Irish soprano (d. 2019)
  1930   – Doug Atkins, American football player (d. 2015)
  1930   – René Maltête, French photographer and poet (d. 2000)
  1930   – Gary Snyder, American poet, essayist, and translator
1932 – Julieta Campos, Cuban-Mexican author and translator (d. 2007)
  1932   – Phyllida Law, Scottish actress
  1932   – Harry Wells, Australian rugby league player
1934 – Leonard Hoffmann, Baron Hoffmann, South African-English lawyer and judge
  1934   – Maurice Norman, English footballer (d. 2022)
  1934   – David Williamson, Baron Williamson of Horton, English soldier and politician (d. 2015)
1935 – Lucius Cary, 15th Viscount Falkland, Scottish politician
  1935   – Princess Elisabeth of Denmark (d. 2018)
  1935   – Jack Charlton, English footballer and manager (d. 2020)
1936 – Kazuo Koike, Japanese author (d. 2019)
  1936   – Haljand Udam, Estonian orientalist and academic (d. 2005)
1937 – Bernard Cleary, Canadian journalist, academic, and politician (d. 2020)
  1937   – Mike Cuellar, Cuban-American baseball player (d. 2010)
  1937   – Carlos Gaviria Díaz, Colombian lawyer and politician (d. 2015)
  1937   – Thomas Pynchon, American novelist
  1937   – Joe Louis Clark, American educator (d. 2020)
1938 – Javed Burki, Indian-Pakistani cricketer
  1938   – Jean Giraud, French author and illustrator (d. 2012)
1939 – Paul Drayton, American sprinter (d. 2010)
  1939   – Keith Lincoln, American football player (d. 2019)
1940 – Peter Benchley, American author and screenwriter (d. 2006)
  1940   – James Blyth, Baron Blyth of Rowington, English businessman and academic
  1940   – Irwin Cotler, Canadian lawyer and politician, 47th Canadian Minister of Justice
  1940   – Emilio Delgado, Mexican-American actor (d. 2022)
  1940   – Ricky Nelson, American singer-songwriter, guitarist, and actor (d. 1985)
  1940   – Toni Tennille, American singer-songwriter and keyboard player 
  1940   – William B. Jordan, American art historian (d. 2018)
1941 – John Fred, American singer-songwriter (d. 2005)
  1941   – Bill Lockyer, American academic and politician, 30th Attorney General of California
  1941   – James Traficant, American lawyer and politician (d. 2014)
1942 – Martin Dobkin, Canadian doctor and politician, 2nd Mayor of Mississauga
  1942   – Robin Hobbs, English cricketer
  1942   – Norman Lamont, Scottish banker and politician, Chancellor of the Exchequer
  1942   – Pierre Morency, Canadian poet and playwright
  1942   – Terry Neill, Irish footballer and manager (d. 2022)
1943 – Pat Barker, English author
  1943   – Johnny Greaves, Australian rugby league player
  1943   – Jon Mark, English-New Zealand singer-songwriter and guitarist (d. 2021)
  1943   – Paul Samwell-Smith, English bass player and producer 
  1943   – Danny Whitten, American singer-songwriter and guitarist (d. 1972)
1944 – Gary Glitter, English singer-songwriter
  1944   – Bill Legend, English drummer
1945 – Arthur Docters van Leeuwen, Dutch jurist and politician (d. 2020)
  1945   – Mike German, Baron German, Welsh educator and politician, Deputy First Minister for Wales
  1945   – Janine Haines, Australian politician (d. 2004)
  1945   – Keith Jarrett, American pianist and composer
1946 – André Boulerice, Canadian politician
  1946   – Jonathan Dancy, English philosopher, author, and academic
1947 – H. Robert Horvitz, American biologist and academic, Nobel Prize laureate
  1947   – Felicity Lott, English soprano
  1947   – John Reid, Baron Reid of Cardowan, Scottish historian and politician, Secretary of State for Defence
1948 – Steve Braun, American baseball player and coach
  1948   – Stephen Stohn, American-Canadian lawyer and producer
1949 – David Vines, Australian economist and academic
1950 – Robert Mugge, American director and producer
  1950   – Lepo Sumera, Estonian composer and educator (d. 2000)
1951 – Philip Bailey, American singer-songwriter, drummer, and actor
  1951   – Mike D'Antoni, American basketball player and coach
  1951   – Chris Frantz, American drummer and producer 
1952 – Peter McNab, Canadian ice hockey player and sportscaster
1953 – Billy Burnette, American singer-songwriter, guitarist, and actor 
  1953   – Alex Van Halen, Dutch-American drummer
1954 – Pam Arciero, American puppeteer and voice actress
  1954   – David Keith, American actor and director
  1954   – John Michael Talbot,  American singer-songwriter and guitarist
1955 – Stephen Furst, American actor and director (d. 2017)
  1955   – Mladen Markač, Croatian general
  1955   – Keith Osgood, English footballer
1956 – Jeff Wincott, Canadian actor and martial artist
1957 – Bill Cowher, American football player and coach
  1957   – Rino Katase, Japanese actress
  1957   – Gary Lunn, Canadian lawyer and politician, 6th Canadian Minister of Natural Resources 
1958 – Roddy Doyle, Irish novelist, playwright, and screenwriter
  1958   – Simone Kleinsma, Dutch actress and singer
  1958   – Brooks Newmark, American-English businessman and politician, Lord of the Treasury
  1958   – Lovie Smith, American football player and coach
1959 – Ronnie Lott, American football player and sportscaster
  1959   – David Manners, 11th Duke of Rutland, English politician
  1959   – Ikue Sakakibara, Japanese actress and singer
1960 – Franco Baresi, Italian footballer and coach
  1960   – Eric Brittingham, American bass player 
1961 – Bill de Blasio, American politician, 109th Mayor of New York City
  1961   – Gert Kruys, Dutch footballer and manager
  1961   – Vallo Reimaa, Estonian academic and politician
  1961   – David Winning, Canadian-American director, producer, and screenwriter
1962 – Natalia Molchanova, Russian diver (d. 2015)
  1962   – David Sole, Scottish rugby player
1963 – Sylvain Cossette, Canadian singer-songwriter 
  1963   – Anthony Field, Australian guitarist, songwriter, producer, and actor 
  1963   – Michel Gondry, French director and screenwriter
  1963   – Izabela Kloc, Polish politician
  1963   – Aleksandr Kovalenko, Belarusian triple jumper
  1963   – Rick Zombo, American ice hockey player and coach
1964 – Päivi Alafrantti, Finnish javelin thrower
  1964   – Melissa Gilbert, American actress and director
  1964   – Bobby Labonte, American race car driver
  1964   – Nathalie Roy, Canadian lawyer and politician
  1964   – Dave Rowntree, English drummer and animator 
  1964   – Metin Tekin, Turkish footballer, manager, and journalist
1966 – Cláudio Taffarel, Brazilian footballer and coach
1967 – Viviana Durante, Italian ballerina and actress
  1967   – Angus Scott, British sports television presenter
1968 – Teet Kask, Estonian ballet dancer and choreographer
  1968   – Mickaël Madar, French footballer
  1968   – Nathalie Normandeau, Canadian politician, Deputy Premier of Quebec
  1968   – Johan Pehrson, Swedish lawyer and politician
1969 – Jonny Searle, English rower
  1969   – Akebono Tarō, American-Japanese sumo wrestler, the 64th Yokozuna
  1969   – John Timu, New Zealand rugby player
1970 – Michael Bevan, Australian cricketer and coach
  1970   – Naomi Klein, Canadian author and activist
  1970   – Luis Enrique, Spanish footballer and manager
1971 – Chuck Huber, American voice actor, director, and screenwriter
  1971   – Candice Night, American singer-songwriter 
1972 – Darren Hayes, Australian singer-songwriter 
  1972   – Ray Whitney, Canadian ice hockey player
1973 – Hiromu Arakawa, Japanese author and illustrator
  1973   – Jesús Arellano, Mexican footballer 
  1973   – Marcus Brigstocke, English comedian, actor, and screenwriter
1974 – Marge Kõrkjas, Estonian swimmer
  1974   – Korey Stringer, American football player (d. 2001)
1975 – Enrique Iglesias, Spanish-American singer-songwriter, producer, and actor
  1975   – Jussi Markkanen, Finnish ice hockey player
  1975   – Gastón Mazzacane, Argentinian race car driver
  1975   – Dmitri Ustritski, Estonian footballer
1976 – Gonçalo Abecasis, Portuguese-American biochemist and academic
  1976   – Martha Wainwright, Canadian-American singer-songwriter and guitarist 
1977 – Joe Bonamassa, American singer-songwriter and guitarist 
  1977   – Bad News Brown, Canadian rapper, harmonica player, and actor (d. 2011)
  1977   – Theodoros Papaloukas, Greek basketball player
  1977   – Kathrin Bringmann, German mathematician and academic
1978 – Lúcio, Brazilian footballer 
  1978   – Jang Woo-hyuk, South Korean rapper and dancer 
1979 – Ole Morten Vågan, Norwegian bassist 
1980 – Keyon Dooling, American basketball player
  1980   – Panagiotis Kafkis, Greek basketball player
  1980   – Evgeny Lebedev, Russian-English publisher and philanthropist
  1980   – Michelle McManus, Scottish singer-songwriter and actress
  1980   – Benny Yau, Hong Kong-Canadian actor and singer
1981 – Stephen Amell, Canadian actor
  1981   – Andrea Barzagli, Italian footballer
  1981   – Tatyana Dektyareva, Russian hurdler
  1981   – Björn Dixgård, Swedish singer-songwriter and guitarist 
  1981   – Manny Gamburyan, Armenian-American mixed martial artist
  1981   – John Maine, American baseball player
1982 – Buakaw Banchamek, Thai kick-boxer
  1982   – Christina Cole, English actress
  1982   – Adrián González, American baseball player
  1982   – Uğur Yıldırım, Turkish-Dutch footballer 
1983 – Juan Martin Goity, Argentinian-German rugby player
  1983   – Bershawn Jackson, American hurdler
  1983   – Lawrence Vickers, American football player
  1983   – Vicky McClure, English actress
1984 – David King, English figure skater
1985 – Tommaso Ciampa, American wrestler 
  1985   – Silvia Stroescu, Romanian gymnast
  1985   – Sarah Vaillancourt, Canadian ice hockey player
  1985   – Usama Young, American football player
1986 – Pemra Özgen, Turkish tennis player
  1986   – Galen Rupp, American runner
  1986   – Marvell Wynne, American soccer player
1987 – Felix Jones, American football player
  1987   – Aarne Nirk, Estonian hurdler
  1987   – Mark Noble, English footballer
  1987   – Kurt Tippett, Australian footballer
1988 – Tanel Kurbas, Estonian basketball player
  1988   – Maicon Pereira de Oliveira, Brazilian footballer (d. 2014)
  1988   – Trisha Paytas, American singer and internet personality
1989 – Liam Bridcutt, English footballer
  1989   – Lars Eller, Danish ice hockey player
  1989   – Dinesh Patel, Indian baseball player
1990 – Kemba Walker, American basketball player
1991 – Ethan Gage, Canadian soccer player
  1991   – Valentijn Lietmeijer, Dutch basketball player 
  1991   – Anamaria Tămârjan, Romanian gymnast
1992 – Kevin Hayes, American ice hockey player
1993 – Pat Cummins, Australian cricketer
1996 – 6ix9ine, American rapper
2001 – Jordyn Huitema, Canadian soccer player
2003 – Moulay Hassan, Crown Prince of Morocco

Deaths

Pre-1600
 535 – Pope John II
 615 – Pope Boniface IV (b. 550)
 685 – Pope Benedict II
 997 – Tai Zong, Chinese emperor (b. 939)
1157 – Ahmed Sanjar, Seljuk sultan (b. 1086)
1192 – Ottokar IV, duke of Styria (b. 1163)
1220 – Richeza of Denmark, queen of Sweden
1278 – Duan Zong, Chinese emperor (b. 1269)
1319 – Haakon V, king of Norway (b. 1270)
1473 – John Stafford, 1st Earl of Wiltshire, English politician (b. 1420)
1538 – Edward Foxe, English bishop and academic (b. 1496)
1551 – Barbara Radziwiłł, queen of Poland (b. 1520)

1601–1900
1668 – Catherine of St. Augustine, French-Canadian nun and saint (b. 1632)
1766 – Samuel Chandler, English minister and author (b. 1693)
1773 – Ali Bey al-Kabir, Egyptian sultan (b. 1728)
1781 – Richard Jago, English priest and poet (b. 1715)
1782 – Sebastião José de Carvalho e Melo, 1st Marquis of Pombal, Portuguese politician, Prime Minister of Portugal (b. 1699)
1785 – Étienne François, duc de Choiseul, French general and politician, Prime Minister of France (b. 1719)
  1785   – Pietro Longhi, Italian painter (b. 1701)
1788 – Giovanni Antonio Scopoli, Italian physician and botanist (b. 1723)
1794 – Antoine Lavoisier, French chemist and biologist (b. 1743)
1819 – Kamehameha I, king of the Hawaiian Islands (b. 1738)
1822 – John Stark, American general (b. 1728)
1828 – Mauro Giuliani, Italian guitarist, cellist, and composer (b. 1781)
1837 – Alexander Balashov, Russian general and politician, Russian Minister of Police (b. 1770)
1842 – Jules Dumont d'Urville, French admiral and explorer (b. 1790)
1853 – Jan Roothaan, Dutch priest, 21st Superior General of the Society of Jesus (b. 1785)
1880 – Gustave Flaubert, French novelist (b. 1821)
1891 – Helena Blavatsky, Russian-English mystic and author (b. 1831)
  1891   – John Robertson, English-Australian politician, 5th Premier of New South Wales (b. 1816)
1893 – Manuel González Flores, Mexican general and president, 1880–1884 (b. 1833)

1901–present
1903 – Paul Gauguin, French painter and sculptor (b. 1848)
1907 – Edmund G. Ross, American soldier and politician, 13th Governor of New Mexico Territory (b. 1826)
1925 – John Beresford, Irish polo player (b. 1847)
1936 – Oswald Spengler, German historian and philosopher (b. 1880)
1941 – Natalie, queen consort of Serbia (b. 1859)
  1941   – Tore Svennberg, Swedish actor and director (b. 1858)
1942 – Nikolai Reek, Estonian general and politician, 11th Estonian Minister of War (b. 1890)
1943 – Mordechai Anielewicz, Polish commander (b. 1919)
1944 – Themistoklis Diakidis, Greek high jumper (b. 1882)
1945 – Frank Bourne, British soldier, last survivor of the Battle of Rorke's Drift (b. 1854)
  1945   – Julius Hirsch, German footballer (b. 1892)
  1945   – Wilhelm Rediess, German SS officer (b. 1900)
  1945   – Bernhard Rust, German lieutenant and politician (b. 1883)
  1945   – Josef Terboven, German lieutenant and politician (b. 1898)
1947 – Harry Gordon Selfridge, American-English businessman, founded Selfridges (b. 1858)
1948 – U Saw, Burmese politician, Prime Minister of Burma (b. 1900)
1950 – Vital Brazil, Brazilian physician and immunologist (b. 1865)
1952 – William Fox, Austrian businessman, founded Fox Theatres (b. 1879)
1959 – John Fraser, Canadian soccer player (b. 1881)
1960 – J. H. C. Whitehead, Indian-English mathematician and academic (b. 1904)
1965 – Wally Hardinge, English cricketer and footballer (b. 1886)
1969 – Remington Kellogg, American zoologist and paleontologist (b. 1892)
1972 – Pandurang Vaman Kane, Indian Indologist and Sanskrit scholar, Bharat Ratna awardee (b. 1880)
  1972   – Beatrice Helen Worsley, Mexican-Canadian computer scientist (b. 1921)
1975 – Avery Brundage, American businessman and art collector (b. 1887)
1980 – Geoffrey Baker, English Field Marshal and Chief of the General Staff of the British Army (b. 1920)
1981 – Uri Zvi Greenberg, Israeli poet and journalist (b. 1896)
1982 – Neil Bogart, American record producer, co-founded Casablanca Records (b. 1943)
  1982   – Gilles Villeneuve, Canadian race car driver (b. 1950)
1983 – John Fante, American author and screenwriter (b. 1909)
1984 – Lila Bell Wallace, American publisher, co-founded Reader's Digest (b. 1890)
  1984   – Gino Bianco, Italian-Brazilian race car driver (b. 1916)
1985 – Karl Marx, German conductor and composer (b. 1897)
  1985   – Theodore Sturgeon, American author and critic (b. 1918)
  1985   – Dolph Sweet, American actor (b. 1920)
1986 – Ernle Bradford, English historian and author (b. 1922)
1987 – Doris Stokes, English psychic and author (b. 1920)
1988 – Robert A. Heinlein,  American science fiction writer and screenwriter (b. 1907)
1990 – Luigi Nono, Italian composer and educator (b. 1924)
1991 – Jean Langlais, French pianist and composer (b. 1907)
  1991   – Rudolf Serkin, Czech-Austrian pianist and educator (b. 1903)
1992 – Joyce Ricketts, American baseball player (b. 1933)
1993 – Avram Davidson, American soldier and author (b. 1923)
1994 – George Peppard, American actor and producer (b. 1928)
1995 – Teresa Teng, Taiwanese singer (b. 1953)
1996 – Beryl Burton, English cyclist (b. 1937)
  1996   – Luis Miguel Dominguín, Spanish bullfighter (b. 1926)
  1996   – Larry Levis, American poet, author, and critic (b. 1946)
  1996   – Garth Williams, American illustrator (b. 1912)
1998 – Johannes Kotkas, Estonian wrestler (b. 1915)
  1998   – Charles Rebozo, American banker and businessman (b. 1912)
1999 – Dirk Bogarde, English actor and screenwriter (b. 1921)
  1999   – Ed Gilbert, American actor (b. 1931)
  1999   – Dana Plato, American actress (b. 1964)
  1999   – Soeman Hs, Indonesian author and educator (b. 1904)
2000 – Pita Amor, Mexican poet and author (b. 1918)
  2000   – Dédé Fortin, Canadian singer-songwriter and guitarist (b. 1962)
  2000   – Henry Nicols, American activist (b. 1973)
2003 – Elvira Pagã, Brazilian vedette, singer, and artist (b. 1920)
2005 – Jean Carrière, French author (b. 1928)
  2005   – Nicolás Vuyovich, Argentinian race car driver (b. 1981)
2006 – Iain Macmillan, Scottish photographer and author (b. 1938)
2007 – Philip R. Craig, American author and poet (b. 1933)
  2007   – Carson Whitsett, American keyboard player, songwriter, and producer (b. 1945)
2008 – Eddy Arnold, American singer-songwriter, guitarist, and actor (b. 1918)
  2008   – François Sterchele, Belgian footballer (b. 1982)
2009 – Dom DiMaggio, American baseball player (b. 1917)
  2009   – Bud Shrake, American journalist and author (b. 1931)
2011 – Lionel Rose, Australian boxer (b. 1948)
2012 – Everett Lilly, American singer-songwriter and guitarist (b. 1924)
  2012   – Jerry McMorris, American businessman (b. 1941)
  2012   – Stacy Robinson, American football player (b. 1962)
  2012   – Maurice Sendak, American author and illustrator (b. 1928)
  2012   – Ampon Tangnoppakul, Thai criminal (b. 1948)
  2012   – Roman Totenberg, Polish-American violinist and educator (b. 1911)
2013 – Jeanne Cooper, American actress (b. 1928)
  2013   – Bryan Forbes, English actor, director, producer, and screenwriter (b. 1926)
  2013   – Juan José Muñoz, Argentinian businessman (b. 1950)
  2013   – Hugh J. Silverman, American philosopher and theorist (b. 1945)
  2013   – Ken Whaley, Austrian-English bass player (b. 1946)
2014 – Roger L. Easton, American scientist, co-invented the GPS (b. 1921)
  2014   – Nancy Malone, American actress, director, and producer (b. 1935)
  2014   – Yago Lamela, Spanish long jumper (b. 1977)
  2014   – Jair Rodrigues, Brazilian singer (b. 1939)
  2014   – R. Douglas Stuart Jr., American businessman and diplomat, United States Ambassador to Norway (b. 1916)
  2014   – Joseph P. Teasdale, American lawyer and politician, 48th Governor of Missouri (b. 1936)
2015 – Zeki Alasya, Turkish actor and director (b. 1943)
  2015   – Mwepu Ilunga, Congolese footballer (b. 1949)
  2015   – Menashe Kadishman, Israeli sculptor and painter (b. 1932)
  2015   – Juan Schwanner, Hungarian-Chilean footballer and manager (b. 1921)
  2015   – Atanas Semerdzhiev, Bulgarian soldier and politician, 1st Vice President of Bulgaria (b. 1924)
2016 – Tom M. Apostol, American analytic number theorist (b. 1923)
  2016   – William Schallert, American actor; president (1979–81) of the Screen Actors Guild (b. 1922)
2018 – Big Bully Busick, American professional wrestler (b. 1954) 
  2018   – Anne V. Coates, British film editor (Lawrence of Arabia, The Elephant Man, Erin Brockovich), Oscar winner (1963) (b. 1925)
2019 – Sprent Dabwido, President of Nauru from 2011 to 2013 (b. 1972)
2021 – Helmut Jahn, German-American architect (b. 1940)
2022 – Robert Gillmor, British wildlife artist and illustrator (b. 1936)
  2022   – Dennis Waterman,  English actor and singer (b. 1948)

Holidays and observances
Christian feast day:
Amato Ronconi 
Apparition of Saint Michael
Arsenius the Great 
Desideratus
 Blessed Catherine of St. Augustine
Julian of Norwich (Anglican, Lutheran)
Magdalene of Canossa
Our Lady of Luján
Peter II of Tarentaise
Blessed Teresa Demjanovich (Ruthenian Catholic Church)
May 8 (Eastern Orthodox liturgics)
Earliest day on which Mother's Day can fall, while May 14 is the latest; celebrated on the second Sunday of May. (United States and others)
Earliest day on which State Flag and State Emblem Day can fall, while May 14 is the latest; celebrated on the second Sunday of May. (Belarus)
Earliest day on which World Fair Trade Day can fall, while May 14 is the latest; celebrated on the second Saturday of May (site of the WFTO) (International)
Emancipation Day (Columbus, Mississippi)
Furry Dance (Helston, UK)
Liberation Day (Czech Republic)
Miguel Hidalgo's birthday (Mexico)
Parents' Day (South Korea)
Truman Day (Missouri)
Veterans Day (Norway)
Victory in Europe Day, and its related observances (Europe):
Time of Remembrance and Reconciliation for Those Who Lost Their Lives during the Second World War, continues to May 9
White Lotus Day (Theosophy)
World Red Cross and Red Crescent Day (International)

References

External links

 BBC: On This Day
 
 Historical Events on May 8

Days of the year
May